WFIW may refer to:

 World Federation of Industry Workers, a former global union federation
 WFIW (AM), a radio station (1390 AM) licensed to Fairfield, Illinois, United States
 WFIW-FM, a radio station (104.9 FM) licensed to Fairfield, Illinois, United States